John Arthur Bartrum (24 May 1885 – 7 June 1949) was a New Zealand geologist and university professor. He was born in Geraldine, South Canterbury, New Zealand on 24 May 1885.

References

1885 births
1949 deaths
20th-century New Zealand geologists
Academic staff of the University of Otago
People from Geraldine, New Zealand
University of Otago alumni